Hansraj Ahir is an Indian politician and current Chairman of the National Commission for Backward classes. He is a former Union Minister of State for Home Affairs and Minister of State for Chemicals and Fertilizers in the First Modi Ministry. He was the former member of the 16th Lok Sabha in India. He was member of 11th Lok Sabha, 14th Lok Sabha, 15th Lok Sabha. He is famous for exposing Coal Mining Scam specially pouni-3 in WCL.

Ahir frequently requested details of coal mining to Prime Minister of India office but he didn't succeed. Finally he (along with Prakash Javadekar) requested Central Vigilance Commission (CVC) for an inquiry. Based on this, CVC ordered a CBI inquiry.

He has been  honoured with Sansad Ratna Award in 2011, 2012, 2013 and 2014.

Political career

He represented the Chandrapur constituency of Maharashtra 4th time from Bharatiya Janata Party (BJP). He had been re-elected from the Chandrapur Lok Sabha Constituency as a member of the 15th Lok Sabha, the results of which were declared on 16 May 2009.
In the 14th Lok Sabha, then Speaker Somnath Chatterjee had hailed Hansraj Gangaram Ahir, member of BJP from Chandrapur in Maharashtra as  role model for MPs.

Achievements

Prime Point Foundation (PPF) has rated BJP MP from Chandrapur, Hansraj Ahir as the best parliamentarian for introduction of 24 private bills out of a total of 288 bills that were introduced so far in the 15th Lok Sabha and Shri Ahir was felicitated with Sansad Ratna Award.
Indian Prime Minister Narendra Modi gave him a position in his cabinet as the Minister of State for Chemical & Fertilizers.

Political career

Positions held

In Parliament

 2004: Member, Committee on Coal & Steel
 2004: Member, Committee on Food Management in Parliament House Complex
 2004: Member, Committee on Agriculture
 2 Jan. 2006:	Member, Joint Parliamentary Committee on Wakf
 5 Aug. 2007:	Member, Standing Committee on Coal and Steel
 31 Aug. 2009:	Member, Committee on Coal and Steel
 23 Sep. 2009:	Member, Committee on Privileges
 15 Mar. 2010:	Member, Railway Convention Committee
 1 May 2013:	Member, Committee on Public Undertakings
 3 May 2013:	Member, Committee on Welfare of Other Backward Classes (OBCs)
 13 June 2014: onwards	Member, Business Advisory Committee
 1 Sep. 2014 - 9 Nov. 2014: Chairperson, Standing Committee on Coal and Steel 
 Tobacco Board; 
 Panchayati Raj Samiti; 
 Rojgar Hami Yojana;
 Bhatkya Vimukta Jati Ashram Shala Samiti

Within BJP

 District President: Chandrapur (1991 to....

Legislative

Member, Maharashtra Legislative Council - 1994 to 1996
 1996 First Elected to 11th Lok Sabha
 2004 Re-elected to 14th Lok Sabha (2nd term)
 2009 Re-elected to 15th Lok Sabha (3rd term)
 2014 Re-elected to 16th Lok Sabha (4th term)
 2019 Lost the Loksabha election to Balu (Suresh) Dhanorkar of Congress

Countries Visited as Delegate Member
 With Hon. President of India visited countries Sweden and Belarus
 Mauritius, South Africa and U.A.E as Member of Parliament.

References

External links

 Official biographical sketch in Parliament of India website

Living people
1954 births
Bharatiya Janata Party politicians from Maharashtra
People from Chandrapur district
Marathi politicians
India MPs 1996–1997
India MPs 2004–2009
India MPs 2009–2014
India MPs 2014–2019
Lok Sabha members from Maharashtra
People from Nanded
Coal block allocation scam
Narendra Modi ministry